Carl Anderson (June 13, 1903 – September 22, 1989) was an American art director. He was nominated for two Academy Awards in the category Best Art Direction.

Selected filmography
Anderson was nominated for two Academy Awards for Best Art Direction:
 The Last Angry Man (1959)
 Lady Sings the Blues (1972)

References

External links

1903 births
1989 deaths
People from Dover, New Jersey
American art directors